Jonathan Flint  is a British behavior geneticist and Professor in Residence in the Department of Psychiatry and Biobehavioral Sciences at the David Geffen School of Medicine at UCLA. He is also a senior scientist in the Center for Neurobehavioral Genetics at UCLA's Semel Institute for Neuroscience and Human Behavior.

Career and research
Flint is known for his research on the genetics of complex traits in mice and major depressive disorder in humans. In 2015, he and his colleagues published a study that was the first to link two genetic variants to this disorder. In 2016, he left his post as director of the Psychiatric Genetics Group at the University of Oxford's Wellcome Trust Centre for Human Genetics to join UCLA. Upon doing so, he became one of four directors of UCLA's Depression Grand Challenge, which aims to conduct a study of 100,000 people to search for genetic risk factors for depression. This study is intended to be the largest genetic study of a disorder ever conducted in humans.
He serves on the editorial board for the journal Current Biology.

Awards and honours
Flint received The Genetics Society's Medal in 2014. He was elected a Fellow of the Royal Society (FRS) in 2019.

References

External links

British geneticists
Living people
David Geffen School of Medicine at UCLA faculty
Wellcome Trust Principal Research Fellows
Population geneticists
Academics of the University of Oxford
Year of birth missing (living people)
Psychiatric geneticists
British psychiatrists
Fellows of the Royal Society